Specific resistance may refer to:
Specific electrical resistance (also known as electric resistivity)
 Specific airway resistance (Raw/functional residual capacity (FRC)
 Cost of transport - specific resistance due to friction for a mechanism transporting mass